Maura and Britta were two 4th-century Christian martyrs. They are venerated as saints, but their story is lost. According to Gregory of Tours, their relics were discovered by his predecessor as Bishop of Tours, Eufronius, in the 6th century. Their feast day is 15 January.

External links
Patron Saints Index article about Britta
Patron Saints Index article about Maura
Catholic Online article about Maura and Britta
Glory of the Confessors

4th-century deaths
Burials at Troyes Cathedral
Groups of Christian martyrs of the Roman era
4th-century Christian martyrs
4th-century Roman women
Gallo-Roman saints
Year of birth unknown